Arthur Gould may refer to:

Arthur Corbin Gould (1850–1903), American shooter and writer on guns
Arthur R. Gould (1857–1946), United States Senator 
Arthur Gould (rugby union) (1864–1919), Welsh rugby union player
Arthur Gould (wrestler) (1892–1948), British Olympic wrestler
Arthur L. Gould, American educator

See also
Arthur Gold (1917–1990), American pianist, author and television presenter
Artur Gold (1897–1943), Polish violinist and composer
Arthur Gould-Porter (1905–1987), British actor